Consuelo is a female given name meaning "solace" or "consolation" in Spanish (a reference to Mary, mother of Jesus, Nuestra Señora del Consuelo i.e. Our Lady of Consolation).

Notable people named Consuelo
 Baby Consuelo, Brazilian performer and composer
 Consuelo Crespi (1928–2010), American-born Italian countess and editor of Italian Vogue
 Consuelo de Saint-Exupéry (1901–1979), wife of novelist Antoine de Saint-Exupéry
 Consuelo Hernández (born c. 1952), Colombian/American poet and writer
 Consuelo Mack, journalist
 Consuelo Moreno-López (1893–2004), a supercentenarian
 Consuelo Portela Audet (1885–1959), Cuban-born Spanish cuplé singer
 Consuelo Silva, Texas-born singer in the Mexican ranchera genre
 Consuelo Vanderbilt, Duchess of Marlborough (1877–1964), a member of the Vanderbilt family
 Consuelo Velázquez (c. 1916 – 2005), Mexican songwriter
 Consuelo Yznaga, Duchess of Manchester (1858–1909)

Fictional characters
 Consuelo, mother of the protagonist in Nahuel and the Magic Book
 Consuelo, member of the ensemble in West Side Story

References 

Spanish feminine given names